New Light Township (also designated Township 14) is one of twenty townships within Wake County, North Carolina,  United States. As of the 2010 census, New Light Township had a population of 7,591, a 61.2% increase over 2000.

References

Townships in Wake County, North Carolina
Townships in North Carolina
Populated places on the Neuse River